Total Loss is the second studio album by American musician How to Dress Well. It was released in September 2012 on Acephale Records in North America and Weird World Records in other regions. The track "Cold Nites", which was co-written and co-produced by Forest Swords, was released as a single.

Critical reception

At Metacritic, which assigns a weighted average score out of 100 to reviews from mainstream critics, the album received an average score of 77% based on 25 reviews, indicating "generally favorable reviews".

It was listed 33rd on Stereogums list of top 50 albums of 2012. Pitchfork placed it at number 28 on its list of the top 50 albums of 2012.

Accolades

Track listing

Charts

References

External links
 

2012 albums
How to Dress Well albums
Albums produced by Rodaidh McDonald